Learning English (previously known as Special English) is a controlled version of the English language first used on 19 October 1959, and still presented daily by the United States broadcasting service Voice of America (VOA). World news and other programs are read one-third slower than regular VOA English. Reporters avoid idioms and use a core vocabulary of about 1500 words, plus any terms needed to explain a story. The intended audience is intermediate to advanced learners of English. In 1962 the VOA published the first edition of the Word Book.

VOA has teamed up with the University of Oregon and produced free online training Let’s Teach English for English language educators. The series is based on the Women Teaching Women English and is aimed for adult beginning level learners.

Examples 
VOA Learning English has multiple daily newscasts and 14 weekly features. These include reports on agriculture, economics, health and current events. Other programs explore American society, U.S. history, idiomatic expressions, science, and arts and entertainment.

For example, an 18 May 2010, script described rheumatoid arthritis this way:

A programme from 15 July 2010, dealt with patent law:

A remembrance of Michael Jackson aired on 5 July 2009, shortly after his death:

For English learners, the service not only provides clear and simple news and information, it also helps them improve their use of American English. In some countries such as the People's Republic of China, VOA Special English is increasingly popular for junior and intermediate English learners. Many teachers around the world, including at the university level, use the programs for language and content.

The BBC and China Radio International have both used the name "Special English" for their slow speed English broadcasts, but they do not appear to have applied the full methodology of the VOA original.

Specialized English
Specialized English is a dialect of Special English developed and used by Feba Radio, and now used by staff in the U.S. and in the U.K. The same parameters apply as for Special English — slow speed, short sentences and restricted vocabulary. The word list has over 90% commonality with that of VOA Special English.

See also

 Basic English

References

External links

Wordlist at VOA
Transcripts, MP3s, archives and podcasts of programs
Voice of America Special English Dictionary
VOA Special English Words with Definitions
Spotlight radio programs
New York Times article on Special English

1959 introductions
Languages attested from the 1950s
English for specific purposes
Voice of America
Simplified languages
Controlled English